Feucherolles is a commune in the Yvelines department in the Île-de-France in north-central France.

Twin towns
Along with Crespières, Chavenay and Saint-Nom-la-Bretèche Feucherolles is twinned with Rösrath, Germany.

See also
Communes of the Yvelines department

References

Communes of Yvelines